Panagiotis Tsakalakos (Greek: Παναγιώτης Τσακαλάκος; born December 16, 1978 in New Jersey, United States), is a Greek-American singer, guitarist and the winner of the second series of Greek Idol. In the final held on June 25, 2011, he won with 53.8% of the public votes against rival finalist Malou Kiriakopoulou. Soon after his win, he released his debut single "Poly Mou Paei".

Panagiotis Tsakalakos parents went to the U.S. in the early 1970s where his father did graduate work at Northwestern. He holds both a bachelor's and master's degree in Music.

Discography

Albums 

2012: Tha Me Vreis (Θα Με Βρείς)

Singles
2008: "I Just Can't Figure Out"
2011: "Poly Mou Paei" (Πολύ Μου Πάει)
2011: "Acharisto Paidi" (Αχάριστο Παιδί)
2012: "Tha Me Vreis" (Θα Με Βρείς)
2018: "Xekinaei" (Ξεκινάει)

References

1978 births
Living people
Idols (TV series) winners
American people of Greek descent
21st-century Greek male singers
Sony Music Greece artists